Camp Creek is a stream in Yosemite National Park, United States. It is a tributary of Piute Creek which is a tributary of the Tuolumne River. Camp Creek head waters start along the southside of Doghead Peak and head west.

Camp Creek was so likely so named when a United States Geological Survey topographer camped there.

See also
List of rivers of California

References

Rivers of Tuolumne County, California
Rivers of Northern California